This article lists the most-visited art museums in the world in 2021, and top museums in 2022 as they are reported. The primary source  is The Art Newspaper annual survey of the number of visitors to major art museums in 2021, published 28 March 2022. 

Total attendance in the top one hundred art museums in 2021 was 71 million visitors, up from 54 million in 2020, but far below the 230 million visitors at the top hundred museums in 2019.

Museums in the United States and Western Europe usually measure attendance for the calendar year from January through December, while many museums in East Asia and Britain measure attendance for the fiscal year, from April through March.

List

See also 

List of most-visited museums
List of most-visited museums in the United States
List of most visited museums in the United Kingdom
List of most visited palaces and monuments
List of most-visited museums by region
List of art museums
List of largest art museums
List of national galleries
List of single-artist museums

Notes

References 



Lists of art museums and galleries
Museums, art